Benthopectinidae is a family of sea stars containing at least 75 species in eight genera. It is the only family in the monotypic order Notomyotida.

These asteroids are deep-sea dwelling and have flexible arms. The inner dorso-lateral surface of the arms contain characteristic longitudinal muscle bands.  Eight genera of deep-water species make up the majority of the family benthopectinidae, and many of its members are expected to have a greater range than is currently recognized.

Taxonomy
Nine genera are recognized:
 Acontiaster Döderlein, 1921
 Benthopecten Verrill, 1884
 Cheiraster Studer, 1883
 Gaussaster Ludwig, 1910
 Myonotus Fisher, 1911
 Nearchaster Fisher, 1911
 Pectinaster Perrier, 1885
 † Plesiastropecten Peyer, 1944 
 Pontaster Sladen, 1885
 Pontasterinae Verrill, 1894

References

Notomyotida
Echinoderm families